A Man With Principles? is a 1943 German comedy film directed by Géza von Bolváry and starring Hans Söhnker, Elfie Mayerhofer, and Sigrid Becker. A young female chemist moves to Hamburg for research where she encounters a handsome, but extremely sexist male colleague. Eventually she manages to conquer his affections and changes his attitude towards woman.

Cast

References

External links

Films of Nazi Germany
German comedy films
1943 comedy films
Films directed by Géza von Bolváry
German black-and-white films
Terra Film films
Films set in Hamburg
1940s German films